Teech is an American sitcom television series that briefly aired on CBS from September 18 to October 16, 1991 as part of its 1991 Fall lineup. The series was co-produced by Nikndaph Productions in association with Columbia Pictures Television for CBS.

Synopsis
Teech stars Phill Lewis as "Teech" Gibson, an African American music instructor (and the "coolest teacher") at Winthrop Academy, a prestigious, predominantly-white prep school.  He has style and drives a Corvair. Teech loves music and has tremendous appeal even to troubled, disruptive students.  Teech also had appeal to Cassie Lee (Maggie Han), the sexy assistant headmaster who had hired him.  Headmaster Alfred Litton (Steven Gilborn) wanted to dismiss Teech's troubled students from the school.  He apparently would like to have done the same to Teech except he realized that so doing would likely open him to charges of racism and discrimination.

Scheduled opposite NBC's Top 20 hit Unsolved Mysteries, Teech drew low ratings and was pulled from the lineup after only four episodes had aired.

Cast
 Phill Lewis as David "Teech" Gibson
 Curnal Achilles Aulisio as George Dubcek, Jr. 
 Steven Gilborn as Alfred W. Litton 
 Maggie Han as Cassie Lee 
 Josh Hoffman as Kenny Freedman 
 Kevin Lawrence Johnson as Boyd Askew 
 Jason Kristofer as Alby Nichols 
 Jack Noseworthy as Adrian Peterman

Production notes
The series was created by David Frankel and Norman Steinberg. Teech'''s theme song "Teach Me" was performed by B.B. King.

Episodes

References
Brooks, Tim and Marsh, Earle, The Complete Directory to Prime Time Network and Cable TV Shows''

External links
  
 

1991 American television series debuts
1991 American television series endings
1990s American black sitcoms
1990s American high school television series
1990s American sitcoms
1990s American workplace comedy television series
CBS original programming
English-language television shows
Television series about educators
Television series about teenagers
Television series by Sony Pictures Television